The 2018 Superbike World Championship was the 31st season of the Superbike World Championship.

2018 was the final season run with the two-race format, as a three-race format was introduced for 2019.

Race calendar and results

Entry list 

All entries used Pirelli tyres.

Championship standings

Riders' championship

Bold – Pole positionItalics – Fastest lap

Manufacturers' championship

Notes

References

External links 

Superbike World Championship seasons
World